Kibe is a surname. Notable people with the surname include:

Akira Kibe (born 1976), Japanese mixed martial artist
Madhav Vinayak Kibe (1877–?), Indian scholar 
Petro Kasui Kibe (1587–1639), Japanese Christian and a Jesuit priest 
Shigeno Kibe (木部 シゲノ 1903–1980), Japanese aviator